Marco Landi (died 1593) was a Roman Catholic prelate who served as Bishop of Ascoli Satriano (1567–1593).

Biography
On 22 August 1567, Marco Landi was appointed Bishop of Ascoli Satriano by Pope Pius V.
On 14 September 1567, he was consecrated bishop by Scipione Rebiba, Cardinal-Priest of Sant'Angelo in Pescheria, with Giulio Antonio Santorio, Archbishop of Santa Severina, and Egidio Valenti, Bishop of Nepi e Sutri, serving as co-consecrators. He served as Bishop of Ascoli Satriano until his death in 1593. While bishop, he was the principal co-consecrator of Bartolomeo Ferro, Bishop of Lettere-Gragnano (1567).

References

External links and additional sources
 (for Chronology of Bishops) 
 (for Chronology of Bishops) 

16th-century Italian Roman Catholic bishops
Bishops appointed by Pope Pius V
1593 deaths